The Pueblo IV Period (AD 1350 to AD 1600) was the fourth period of ancient pueblo life in the American Southwest.  At the end of prior Pueblo III Period, Ancestral Puebloans living in the Colorado and Utah regions abandoned their settlements and migrated south to the Pecos River and Rio Grande valleys.  As a result, pueblos in those areas saw a significant increase in total population.

The Pueblo IV Period (Pecos Classification) is similar to the "Regressive Pueblo Period" or, referring to the Ancient Pueblo People of Colorado and Utah, the "Post Pueblo Period." It is preceded by the Pueblo III Period, and is followed by the present Pueblo V Era.

Architecture
Puebloan villages in Arizona and New Mexico had multi-storied pueblos of up to a thousand clustered rooms. The New Mexico villages were generally larger than those of western region, which had large plazas with long, rectangular kivas.

Communities
The great migration out of Colorado and Utah at the end of the Pueblo III Period resulted in an influx of people into the Rio Grande and Little Colorado River valleys.  Within Arizona and New Mexico there was an aggregation of people from outlying sites to larger pueblos.  The puebloan territory of the Pueblo IV Period also included the White Mountains, Verde Valley, Anderson Mesa, and Pecos areas.
 Rio Grande valley. Many puebloan people were found in the Rio Grande Valley, including the Acoma Pueblo and Zuni Pueblo areas, when the Spanish arrived about 1540.
 Bandelier area pueblos experienced considerable construction, increased population and improved standard of living after 1300.  Black-on-white pottery excavated at Bandelier was indistinguishable from that of the Mesa Verde National Park, indicating that at least some of the new residents came from Mesa Verde.
 Abandoned communities. Many of the sites of the early Pueblo IV period were abandoned by the 15th century, such as those in the White Mountains, Verde Valley, Middle Little Colorado River and Anderson Mesa. Petrified Forest villages were generally abandoned by the late 16th century.  The land continued to be used for its resources and for travel.

Spanish colonization
An upsurge in the lifestyle of the Rio Grande valley residents in the beginning of the Pueblo IV Period was tempered by the 16th century Spanish colonization of the Americas which extended north into New Mexico.  Don Juan de Oñate, the colonial governor of the New Spain province of New Mexico, led 400 soldiers and farmers in 1598 to establish settlements into the Rio Grande valley area.

Culture and religion
 The people of the Frijoles Canyon in Bandelier area in the 14th century had black hair and red-brown skin and were short in stature, an average of about 5 feet and 4 inches tall for men.  Women were about 5 feet tall. Generally, couples had a few children.  Domesticated dogs were often part of a family's household.
 Religion. The Ancient Pueblo People integrated Kachina religious rituals into their lives by 1300. This helped to integrate diverse groups of people who migrated into the area and inhabited the large pueblos.  The culture inspired a life of mutual cooperation, food sharing and religious rituals, such as rain-making.  Kachina images appeared in murals in kivas, pictographs and petroglyphs. The Kachina religion was foundational for modern Zuni and Hopi people.

Agriculture
Sites were located next to reliable water sources which were often used to irrigate farm land.  Gardens were established in terraces and stone-outlined "waffle gardens" near the pueblo.  Once harvested, maize was ground using manos and metates.  The presence of griddle stones hints at the creation of baked paper-like cornbread.

Small game and birds were hunted or trapped and seasonal wild plants were gathered to supplement the diet:
 Spring – beeweed and mustard greens
 Summer – chokecherries, currants, gooseberries and raspberries, yucca fruit
 Fall – seeds, nuts, juniper berries and prickly pears

Pottery
Plain surfaced pottery replaced the corrugated pottery of the Pueblo II and III Periods.  Red, yellow and orange ware and polychrome (multiple-colored) pottery replaced black-on-white pottery of the previous pueblo periods.  The pottery was often mass-produced, high quality pottery, and in the case of the western Ancestral Pueblo, included Kachina figure and symbol designs. Glazed pots, created when mineral paints on the pottery surface were fired at high temperatures, emerged in the Ancestral Pueblo sites.  Artisans in the Petrified Forest created sophisticated Glaze-on-Red polychrome pottery.

Other material goods
Emerging material goods during this period were small triangular projectile points and piki stones for making bread.

Cultural groups and periods
The cultural groups of this period include:
 Ancestral Puebloans – southern Utah, southern Colorado, northern Arizona and northern and central New Mexico.
 Hohokam – southern Arizona.
 Mogollon – southeastern Arizona, southern New Mexico and northern Mexico.
 Patayan – western Arizona, California and Baja California.

Notable Pueblo IV sites

Gallery

References

Further reading
 Reed, Paul F. (2000) Foundations of Anasazi Culture: The Basketmaker Pueblo Transition. University of Utah Press. .
 Stuart, David E.; Moczygemba-McKinsey, Susan B. (2000) Anasazi America: Seventeen Centuries on the Road from Center Place. University of New Mexico Press. .
 Wenger, Gilbert R. The Story of Mesa Verde National Park. Mesa Verde Museum Association, Mesa Verde National Park, Colorado, 1991 [1st edition 1980].  .

Native American history of Arizona
Native American history of Colorado
Native American history of Nevada
Native American history of New Mexico
Native American history of Utah
Oasisamerica cultures
Pueblo history
Southwest periods in North America by Pecos classification